The Jewish Chronicle (The JC) is a London-based Jewish weekly newspaper. Founded in 1841, it is the oldest continuously published Jewish newspaper in the world. Its editor (since December 2021) is Jake Wallis Simons.

The newspaper is published every Friday (except when this is a Jewish holiday, when it appears earlier in the week) providing news, opinion pieces, social, cultural and sports reports, as well as editorials and a spectrum of readers' opinions on the letter page. The news section of its website is updated several times a day.

The average weekly circulation in 2018 was 20,141, of which 7,298 were free copies, down from 32,875 in 2008. In February 2020, it announced plans to merge with the Jewish News but, in April 2020, entered voluntary liquidation and was acquired from the liquidators by a private consortium of political insiders, broadcasters and bankers.

History

19th century
The Jewish Chronicle first appeared on 12 November 1841. Its first editors were D. Meldola and M. Angel. It was issued as a weekly until May 1842, when it was suspended. From October 1844, it resumed as a fortnightly, with Joseph Mitchell as its editor. In 1847, it became again a weekly newspaper. A. Benisch, who became the proprietor and editor in 1855, bequeathed the paper to the Anglo-Jewish Association in 1878, who sold it to its new editor and anti-Zionist Asher I. Myers, Sydney M. Samuel and Israel David.

In 1881, the leaders of the Jewish community in London were being criticised for not campaigning against the pogroms that were taking place in the Russian Empire. Under the leadership of Francis Henry Goldsmid, the pogroms were not mentioned by the newspaper and it was only after the feminist Louisa Goldsmid gave her support following calls to arms by an anonymous writer named "Juriscontalus" and Asher Myers of The Jewish Chronicle that action was taken. Public meetings were then held across the country and Jewish and Christian leaders in Britain spoke out against the atrocities.

20th century

In December 1906, L.J. Greenberg, a successful advertising agent and English Zionist leader, contacted the Dutch banker Jacobus Kann with the object of buying The Jewish Chronicle to promote Zionism. The same month, Greenberg, together with David Wolffsohn, Joseph Cowen, Jacobus H. Kahn, and Leopold Kessler, bought the shares. Greenberg himself became its editor.

At the time, The Jewish Chronicle gained a near monopoly in the Jewish press, taking over its principal competitors, The Hebrew Observer and The Jewish World. Only in October 1919, did The JC get a strong opposing voice from The Jewish Guardian, paper of the League of British Jews, which counterbalanced the Zionist views of The JC, until it disappeared in 1931. After Greenberg died the same year, The JC remained moderately pro-Zionist under the leadership of Leopold Kessler.

The weekly newspaper The Jewish World was taken over in 1913. It published articles by various Zionist leaders, as well as early non-Jewish pro-Zionists. In 1934, it was merged with The Jewish Chronicle. After 1948, the paper maintained a pro-Israel attitude.

In the late 1930s, David F. Kessler became managing director to assist his chairman father Leopold Kessler, a moderate Zionist and an associate of Theodor Herzl, known as the father of the State of Israel. After service as a soldier in World War II during which his father had died, Kessler found that the editor, Ivan Greenberg, had taken a right-wing Zionist position highly critical of moderate Zionists and the British policy in Palestine. Kessler, after a struggle with the newspaper's board, sacked Greenberg and installed a moderate editor.

By the early 1960s, the Kessler family owned 80% of the newspaper's shares. To safeguard the newspaper's future, Kessler created a foundation ownership structure loosely modelled on the Scott Trust, owners of The Guardian. Kessler was chairman for nearly 30 years until his death in 1999.

Joseph Finklestone wrote for the paper from 1946 to 1992 in roles including sports editor, chief sub-editor, home news editor, assistant editor, foreign editor, and diplomatic editor.

Geoffrey Paul (birth name Goldstein) was editor between 1977 and 1990.

21st century
Editors of The Jewish Chronicle have included Ned Temko, 1990 to 2005, Jeff Barak (managing editor, 2006), who returned to Israel, and David Rowan, 2006 to 2008, who joined The Observer. Stephen Pollard became editor in November 2008 and editor-at-large in December 2021. He was succeeded as Editor by Jake Wallis Simons. 

The Jewish Chronicle was relaunched in 2008.

In 2018, the newspaper had a loss of about £1.5 million on operating costs of about £4.9 million, following losses in the previous two years. After a number of years of declining circulation and a pension deficit, the reserves of its owners since 1984, the charity The Kessler Foundation, had been exhausted and they planned to introduce revenue and cost measures to reduce losses. According to the editor, the paper had been facing the "real threat" of having to close and the Press Gazette reported its situation as "facing a grave closure threat". Jonathan Goldstein, chairman of the Jewish Leadership Council, organised a consortium of 20 individuals, families and charitable trusts to make donations to The Kessler Foundation to enable its continued support of the newspaper. Alan Jacobs, founder of Jacobs Capital, became the new chairman.

In February 2020, The Jewish Chronicle and Jewish News announced plans to merge, subject to raising the necessary finance to support the merger. Combined, they print more than 40,000 copies weekly. 

On 8 April 2020, The Jewish Chronicle went into liquidiation, and both papers announced their intentions to close, due to the coronavirus pandemic. In April 2020, when the Chronicle faced closure due to financial problems during the Covid pandemic, threats to the paper's survival were met by sadness and some jubilation, with journalists Jonathan Freedland and Hadley Freeman expressing sorrow, and some Labour supporters welcoming its demise and speculating that libel payouts were impacting on its finances.

The Kessler Trust launched a bid to buy the two papers, giving editorial control to the senior staff of the News. However, a £2.5 million counter-offer, supported by the editor, was accepted by the liquidiators and trust in what The Guardian described as a brief but messy takeover bid. The consortium was led by Robbie Gibb and included John Woodcock, broadcasters Jonathan Sacerdoti and John Ware and Jonathan Kandel, former Charity Commission chairman William Shawcross, Rabbi Jonathan Hughes, Investec’s corporate and institutional banking chief operating officer Robert Swerling, managing partner at EMK Capital Mark Joseph, and Tom Boltman, head of strategic initiatives at Kovrr, with support from anonymous philanthropists. The consortium said it was running the paper as a community asset not for profit, and that they would set up a trust to ensure its editorial independence. The News was then taken out of liquidation.

Editorial position
Under the ownership of Asher Myers and Israel Davis, from 1878, the paper was hostile to Zionism, in line with the official positions of the religious and lay leaders of the community. After Leopold Greenberg had taken over the paper in 1906, it became strongly Zionist and it was made into "a firm and influential champion of Zionism".

The JC supported the 1917 Balfour Declaration, the publication of which was postponed for a week in order to allow The Jewish Chronicle to publish its opinion in time. After the Declaration was issued, however, the paper became critical of Chaim Weizmann. Greenberg was discontented with the too vague definition of the Zionist goals and wanted him to state clearly that Palestine must be politically Jewish. He wanted to define the "National Home" as a Jewish Commonwealth. Although JC's support of Zionism somewhat decreased after Greenberg's death, it has consistently devoted considerable space to Israel and Zionism.

Under Leopold Greenberg, The Jewish Chronicle was hostile to the Reform and Liberal movements in Britain. Over the years, attention shifted from Orthodoxy in Anglo-Jewry to developments in Progressive Judaism, while becoming more critical of the Orthodox position on halakhic issues.

The then-editor Stephen Pollard accepted that the paper does not present a comprehensive picture of events, saying in 2009, "But don't forget who our readership is. They are interested in getting the news about Israel. It's not a biased view. We are presenting one aspect of all the news that is going on. Nobody gets all their news from The JC; we're a complementary news source."

In 2014, he apologised on behalf of the paper for running an advertisement by the Disasters Emergency Committee appealing for funds for humanitarian relief for Gaza. He said that he and the paper did not support the appeal and were "entirely supportive" of Operation Protective Edge. He disputed the reported number of civilian casualties and asserted that many were terrorists.

In June 2019, Pollard said "I think in the last few years there's certainly been a huge need for the journalism that The JC does in especially looking at the anti-Semitism in the Labour party and elsewhere" and "there's such a huge need for our proper crusading independent journalism". Kessler Foundation chair Clive Wolman said: "In the end, we and the JC Trust decided that our primary consideration had to be to preserve the editorial independence of The JC, particularly at a time when its journalists are playing such an important role in exposing antisemitism in British politics. In July 2019, Pollard said that the Jewish community wants "to see [the current Labour Party leadership] removed from any significant role in public life."

Notable interviews

In 1981, The Jewish Chronicle published an interview with then Prime Minister, Margaret Thatcher. Thatcher was questioned regarding the state of Israel and how Conservative policy affected the Jewish community.

In September 1999, it was the first non-Israeli newspaper to conduct an interview with Ehud Barak during his term as Prime Minister of Israel.

In December 2007, the newspaper published an interview with Labour Party donor David Abrahams.

In July 2013, The Jewish Chronicle hosted an audience with UKIP leader Nigel Farage. Farage was interviewed by editor Stephen Pollard, and took questions from the audience.

Criticism

In August 2016, dozens of prominent Jewish activists including Miriam Margolyes, Ilan Pappe and Michael Rosen signed an open letter criticising the paper for what they viewed as its "McCarthyite" "character assassination" of Jeremy Corbyn after the paper published "seven key questions" for Corbyn, including on his alleged ties to and defence of various Holocaust deniers and on his use of the word "friends" for Hamas and Hezbollah.

In December 2019, The Jewish Chronicle published an article by Melanie Phillips which asserted that Islamophobia was a bogus term which provided cover for antisemites. The Board of Deputies of British Jews described its publication as an error, and editor Stephen Pollard acknowledged that "A number of people within the Jewish community, and friends of the community, have expressed their dismay – and anger – at its content."

When The Jewish Chronicle faced closure due to financial problems in April 2020, former ANC politician and anti-apartheid activist Andrew Feinstein stated: "The Jewish Chronicles equating of antisemitism with criticism of Israel has put back the struggle against real AS & all racism by years." while the freelance journalist Mira Bar-Hillel considered the paper's potential closure to be "the best news of the day" and referred to it as a "pathetic rag".

In July 2021, a letter was sent to the British press regulatory body IPSO requesting a standards investigation into The Jewish Chronicle due to what the signatories believed to be "systemic" failings. The nine signatories were mostly linked to the Labour party, and had either been libelled by The Jewish Chronicle or had complaints about factually inaccurate reporting upheld by the regulator between 2018 and 2021. The complainants alleged that the paper's editorial standards were "shockingly low" and stated that "unless standards there improve there will be more victims, while readers will continue to be misled." 

Writing in the Byline Times, Brian Cathcart, Professor of Journalism at Kingston University, argued that IPSO had failed to act on "the collapse of journalism standards at The Jewish Chronicle", which he stated had "been found by the IPSO itself to have breached its code of practice 28 times." He suggested IPSO's failure to act was in part due to the regulator's unwillingness to attract accusations of attempting to silence the paper from the Conservative Party, who benefitted politically from the debate around antisemitism in the Labour Party in which the paper was a prominent player. He also identified The Jewish Chronicles owner Robbie Gibb as an obstacle to an IPSO investigation into standards at the paper. Cathcart further stated that The Jewish Chronicle offered "vivid proof" that IPSO's remedies were ineffective in upholding journalistic standards.

Lawsuits and rulings relating to false and inaccurate reporting

In 1968, The Jewish Chronicle accused Labour MP Christopher Mayhew of making antisemitic comments on a television programme. Mayhew sued for libel, arguing that his comments were anti-Zionist but not antisemitic. He received a public apology in the High Court. A complaint by Mayhew to the Press Council in April 1971, about the editing of a published letter to the editor, was rejected.

In 2009, a peace activist accepted £30,000 damages and an apology from the paper over false claims that he had harboured two suicide bombers.

In September 2014, the Press Complaints Commission (PCC) published details of a complaint about an editorial alleging the Royal Institute of British Architects (RIBA) had banned Jews from the International Union of Architects (IUA), and was thus antisemitic. The complaint was resolved when the PCC negotiated that the Chronicle publish a letter in response by the complainant.

In November 2014, Middle East Monitor reported that the Press Complaints Commission had published details of a complaint made by the director of the Palestine Solidarity Campaign (PSC) about the Chronicles reporting that July of her words, which had stated that she had described PSC supporters as antisemitic; the complaint was resolved when the newspaper published a correction online.

In August 2017, The Jewish Chronicle published a ruling by the Independent Press Standards Organisation (IPSO) that an article it had published earlier that year about a court case was in breach of the Editors' Code of Practice by identifying family members of the defendant. The Judge did not accept the defences of The Jewish Chronicle that the family members were prominent members of the community or that the family had been referenced in the proceedings, albeit without identifying individual members.

In February 2018, The Jewish Chronicle falsely reported that a blogger and Labour Party member was a Holocaust denier. IPSO upheld a complaint that the newspaper had misrepresented online comments, although it rejected three of his four complaints about accuracy.

From mid-2018 to mid-2020, eight complaints to IPSO about the paper were upheld, two not upheld and two resolved through mediation.

In August 2019, the British charity Palestinian Relief and Development Fund (Interpal) received an apology, damages of £50,000 and legal costs after The Jewish Chronicle published "false and defamatory allegations", implying that it had links to terrorist activity. On 23 August, the paper published a full apology, together with an article by Ibrahim Hewitt, chair of trustees of Interpal.

In November 2019, The Jewish Chronicle published a ruling by IPSO that it had breached the Editors’ Code of Practice in relation to claims in four articles about a Labour Party member published in early 2019. IPSO also expressed significant concerns about the newspaper's repeated failure to answer IPSO's questions and said it considered that the publication's conduct during the investigation was unacceptable. In February 2020, The Jewish Chronicle acknowledged that they had made untrue and distressing allegations, for which they apologised, and agreed to pay damages and legal costs.

In December 2019, IPSO found that The Jewish Chronicle breached the Editors’ Code by falsely describing a Labour Party activist as Jewish and as a member of the executive of the Labour Representation Committee; the paper corrected the article and published a full correction online.

In September 2020, The Jewish Chronicle published an apology to a councillor about whom the newspaper had printed numerous false and libellous allegations. The newspaper alleged that the councillor was involved in inviting an activist, who it deemed to be antisemitic, to a Labour Party event; that the councillor ignored "antisemitic statements" made by a fellow activist; and that the councillor had "launched a vicious protest against Luciana Berger MP in terms suggestive of antisemitism" and had tried to "improperly interfere with a democratic vote at a regional Labour Party meeting". In addition to the apology, The Jewish Chronicle, its editor Stephen Pollard, and senior reporter Lee Harpin paid substantial libel damages and the legal costs.

Also in September 2020, IPSO upheld a complaint against The Jewish Chronicle by Shahrar Ali, home affairs spokesman for the Green Party of England and Wales. The newspaper published claims in December 2019 that Ali had compared the Israel Defense Forces' actions during the Gaza War of 2009 to the Holocaust in a speech given on Holocaust Memorial Day in 2009. IPSO ruled that the publication "had failed to take care not to publish misleading information, and failed to distinguish between comment and fact" in relation to its published interpretation of Ali's comments, and had been inaccurate in reporting the timing of the speech as it had not occurred on Holocaust Memorial Day.

In March 2021, The Jewish Chronicle published false and defamatory claims against political activist and journalist Marc Wadsworth. The article stated that Wadsworth was involved in a potentially criminal "conspiracy to intimidate, threaten or harass Jewish activists into silence" in an online meeting of the Labour in Exile Network. In reality Wadsworth had issued no such threats, had not attended the meeting and was not a member of the Labour in Exile Network. On 26 May 2021, the newspaper admitted the story was false in all respects, issued an apology, and agreed to pay damages. On 22 July 2021, the High Court of England and Wales found The Jewish Chronicle to be guilty of libelling Wadsworth in this matter. Following the libel verdict, Wadsworth said he was "deeply distressed that The Jewish Chronicle did not check its facts or contact me before its article was written. Instead, it chose to publish serious and unfounded allegations, linking me with potential criminality, which go to the heart of my reputation as a journalist and long-standing campaigner against racism."

In December 2021, IPSO upheld a complaint against the Jewish Chronicle for a breach of the Editors’ Code of Practice, Clause 1 (Accuracy). In June 2021, an article titled “EXCLUSIVE: Secret tape from inside Palestine convoy revealed” claimed that a poster stating “What is antisemitic in saying that all Jews support violence and imperialism?” was displayed at a pro-Palestinian rally. In actual fact, the poster stated “What is antisemitic is saying that all Jews support violence and imperialism!”. The change of wording and the replacement of the exclamation mark with a question mark "distorted the meaning of the poster" and the committee considered this a "significant inaccuracy".

In June 2022 IPSO rejected a series of complaints about an article in The Jewish Chronicle but found it had breached the Editors Code by misleadingly reporting the reason its subject's dismissal from his job.

Chief editors
 Asher Myers (fl. 1881)
 L. J. Greenberg (1907–1931)
 William Frankel (1958–1977)
 Geoffrey Paul (1977–1990)
 Ned Temko (1990–2005)
 David Rowan (2006–2008)
 Jeff Barak (managing editor) (2007–2008)
 Stephen Pollard (2008– 2021); editor-at-large from December 2021
 Jake Wallis Simons (from December 2021)

See also
 Hamodia
 Jewish Tribune (UK)
 Jewish News

References

Bibliography

External links
 

1841 establishments in England
Jewish newspapers published in the United Kingdom
Newspapers established in 1841
Weekly newspapers published in the United Kingdom